S.S. Memorial Educational Academy, Saifai is a private teacher training college located in Saifai, Etawah district, Uttar Pradesh, India. It was established in 2011 and first batch take admission in 2012 after NCTE approval.

Academics
S.S. Memorial Educational Academy offers a two-year BTC course which is now known as Diploma in Elementary Education (D.El.Ed.). In 2012, the institute was recognized for 50 BTC seats by National Council for Teacher Education (NCTE) for 2012-13 session.

References

External links
 Official website

Universities and colleges in Saifai
Colleges of education in India
Educational institutions established in 2011
2011 establishments in Uttar Pradesh